Sports teams in Florida include many professional, semi-professional, amateur and college teams. In professional sports, Florida has three National Football League teams, two Major League Baseball teams, two National Basketball Association teams, two National Hockey League teams, two Major League Soccer teams, one Women's Soccer team and many minor league teams in various sports. Additionally, since the late 19th century Florida has been a significant spring training destination for Major League Baseball teams and their affiliates. 

In college sports, thirteen Florida schools compete in NCAA Division I. Various others compete in other organizations including NCAA Division II, the NAIA, the NJCAA, the USCAA, and the NCCAA.

Professional major league teams

Florida has teams in all of the major league sports — National Football League, Major League Baseball, National Basketball Association, National Hockey League, and Major League Soccer. In the early 1980s, Florida had major league teams in only the NFL. Florida has since added two NBA teams in the late 1980s. Florida added two NHL teams in the 1990s as part of the NHL's expansion into the south, and two MLB teams in the 1990s. Florida's most recent major-league team, Inter Miami CF, began play in MLS in 2020, after Florida's first MLS team since the folding of the Tampa Bay Mutiny and Miami Fusion in 2001, Orlando City, joined in 2015.

*Team has folded

Spring training
Florida is the traditional home for Major League Baseball spring training, with teams informally organized into the "Grapefruit League." , Florida hosts the following major league teams for spring training:

Individual sports

Golf, tennis and auto racing are popular in Florida.

The Professional Golfers Association of America (PGA), the trade association for club professionals which organizes major championships for men and women and also co-organizes the biennial Ryder Cup, is headquartered in Palm Beach Gardens. The PGA Tour, which has been separate from the PGA of America since 1968, has its home base in Ponte Vedra Beach, while the LPGA is headquartered in Daytona Beach. The Players Championship, sometimes referred to as the fifth (men's) major, is held every year near Jacksonville. Additionally, the WGC Championship, Arnold Palmer Invitational, Honda Classic and Valspar Championship are PGA Tour events.

In tennis, the Miami Open is an ATP Tour Masters 1000 and WTA Premier Mandatory event. The Delray Beach International Tennis Championships is an ATP World Tour 250 event.

NASCAR (headquartered in Daytona Beach) begins all three of its major auto racing series in Florida at Daytona International Speedway in February, featuring the Daytona 500, and ends all three Series in November at Homestead-Miami Speedway. Daytona also has the Coke Zero 400 NASCAR race weekend around Independence Day in July. The 24 Hours of Daytona is one of the world's most prestigious endurance auto races. The Grand Prix of St. Petersburg and Grand Prix of Miami have held IndyCar races as well.

Auto racing tracks
Daytona International Speedway
Homestead-Miami Speedway
Sebring Raceway
Florida International Rally and Motorsports Park
Palm Beach International Raceway
Streets of St. Petersburg
Walt Disney World Speedway (demolished)
New Smyrna Speedway
Five Flags Speedway
Gainesville Raceway

Minor league and semi-pro teams

College sports

See also
 Sports in Florida

References

 
Florida
Teams